Jeffrey L. Kessler is a partner at the international law firm Winston & Strawn, where he also serves as co-executive chairman and co-chair of the firm's antitrust/competition and sports law practices. Until May 2012, he was the global litigation chair at the international law firm Dewey & LeBoeuf, where he was also the co-chair of the sports litigation practice group and served on the firm's executive and leadership committees. His major clients include the National Football League Players Association, the National Basketball Players Association, William Morris Endeavor, Activision Blizzard, Avanci, the Major League Baseball Players Association, the players on the United States Women’s National Soccer Team, NTN Corporation, and Panasonic Corporation (formerly, Matsushita Electric).

Early life
Kessler was born in Brooklyn, New York, in 1954 to Edith and Milton Kessler. He grew up in a community in Brooklyn near Coney Island called Sea Gate with his parents and his older sister Linda. He went on to Columbia University, graduating summa cum laude from the college in the class of 1975 and then Columbia Law School. He graduated there as a Kent Scholar and editor of the Law Review in 1977. He was one of five Columbia alumni who received the college's 2016 John Jay Award for distinguished professional achievement.

Professional career
Kessler began working at Weil, Gotshal & Manges as an associate in the Anti-Trust Department full-time in 1977, after working there as a summer associate in 1976. He went on to become a partner in 1984. From 1976 to 2003 he was the lead counsel in various complex antitrust, sports law and IP law cases, including major jury trials. He represented a number of US and international companies in criminal and civil investigations in the antitrust and trade areas and was part of the team that successfully defended Matsushita Electric and JVC against claims of a worldwide conspiracy in the landmark U.S. Supreme Court case, Zenith v. Matsushita. He became regarded as a leading commentator on international antitrust law.  He also was the lead counsel in several intellectual property cases involving frontier issues of IP law.

Kessler became known as one of the most prominent sports lawyer in the U.S. as he became regularly engaged in high-profile sports litigation. He litigated some all known sports-antitrust cases while at Weil, including McNeil v. the NFL, the antitrust jury trial which led to the establishment of free agency in the National Football League (NFL). He also handled numerous sports law cases for clients including the NFLPA, the NBPA, the Arena Football League Players Association, the National Hockey League Players Association, the Major League Baseball Players Association, the NFL Coaches Association, Players, Inc., the Women's Tennis Benefit Association and Adidas. Kessler represented various classes of NBA, NFL, AFL and MLS players, and several professional leagues, including the North American Soccer League and United States Football League, and the cities of San Diego and Oakland and Alameda County, in various sports law disputes. He also successfully represented Latrell Sprewell in his controversial suspension arbitration.

Move to Dewey
In 2003 Kessler left Weil to join the law firm Dewey Ballantine. Dewey Ballantine later merged with the law firm LeBoeuf & Lam and Kessler was at the newly created "super firm" Dewey & LeBoeuf, where he was the chairman of the firm's global litigation department, co-chairman of the sports litigation practice group, and a member of its executive and leadership committees. He has also recently done work on behalf of the National Invitation Tournament, CAA Sports, Wasserman Media Group, SCP Worldwide, and pro bono work for South African Amputee Sprinter Oscar Pistorious and Castor Semanaya. Both runners were successfully represented by Kessler and allowed to continue their careers despite challenges from the International Association of Athletics Federations (IAAF). Kessler negotiated the current free agency/salary cap systems in the NFL, NBA, and successfully represented Michael Vick in his roster bonus arbitration, Plaxico Burress in his signing bonus arbitration, and numerous other players in successful arbitrations and "special master cases".

Kessler has been a lecturer in law at Columbia Law School, where he has taught a course on complex litigation. He has written and lectured on a wide variety of antitrust, sports law and related topics. He published a new edition of International Trade and U.S. Antitrust Law, a leading treatise on antitrust and trade law issues in a global economy, and was co-editor-in-chief of State Antitrust Practice and Statutes. Kessler is a former council member and co-chair of the Publications Committee and chairman of the International Antitrust Law Committee, of the Antitrust Section of the American Bar Association (ABA).  He was also a member of the ABA's NAFTA Tri-National Committee and an adjunct professor of law at Fordham Law School. He was a founding member of the board of advisors of the Georgetown University Study of Private Antitrust Litigation.

Kessler has been recognized by numerous publications, including Chambers USA - America's Leading Lawyers for Business and Best Lawyers in America. He is recognized by Guide to the World's Leading Antitrust Lawyers and Who's Who of Competition Lawyers and has been included in Super Lawyers, Corporate Counsel Edition 2009, The Lawdragon 500 Leading Lawyers in America 2005, 2006 and 2008 through 2011 and Lawdragon 500 Leading Litigators in America 2006. Kessler is named in the 2011 edition of The Best Lawyers in America and as a New York Super Lawyer in 2006 through 2012, and he has been named as one of The 50 Most Influential People in Sports Business by Street & Smith's SportsBusiness Journal and that publication has named him one of the 20 Most Influential People in the NFL numerous times including most recently in 2011. Kessler has also been named a National General Commercial Litigation Star by Benchmark Litigation.

Move to Winston
In May 2012, Kessler left Dewey & LeBoeuf and joined the firm of Winston & Strawn. Dewey had experienced mass partner defections starting in March 2012 for a variety of reasons, and despite his best efforts in conjunction with several other of the firms most prominent and successful partners to save the firm it proved to be unmanageable. Thus, Kessler led a group of over 20 other partners, over 40 associates, and a large group of professional staff with him to Winston where he currently is a Partner and Co-Executive Chairman of the firm. In total, more than 75 people went with him from Dewey to Winston including his entire practice.

Since joining Winston, Kessler led the Winston team that secured a widely reported, spectacular victory on behalf of classes of Division I college football and basketball athletes in their landmark antitrust challenge to the compensation restrictions maintained by the National Collegiate Athletic Association (NCAA) and its member “power conferences.” Following oral argument by Kessler, on March 31, 2021, the U.S. Supreme Court issued a unanimous decision affirming the team’s “ground-breaking and historic” trial win in the Northern District of California, and reiterating that the NCAA is not above antitrust laws. The trial win came in March 2019, when Judge Wilken found that the NCAA was in violation of the antitrust laws by limiting the amount of compensation that college basketball and football players could receive, and issued a trial ruling in favor of the plaintiff athlete classes, which included an injunction barring the NCAA and its member conferences from limiting the amount of education-related compensation that Division I college basketball and FBS football players could receive.

Following this win and as its next step in protecting the rights of amateur athletes, a Kessler-led Winston team has joined the House litigation as co-lead plaintiff’s counsel. The student athlete plaintiffs in House allege that NCAA’s rules limiting student athletes from profiting from their name, image, and/or likeness (NIL) violated antitrust law by prohibiting them from earning NIL-related compensation until July 1, 2021, and continue to do so by imposing anticompetitive restrictions via NCAA’s current NIL policy. Plaintiffs seek monetary damages for previous denial of these rights and an injunction restraining the NCAA from enforcing current rules.

Kessler has achieved other recent wins in significant antitrust cases, including (1) on behalf of Panasonic, sustaining Panasonic’s efforts to oppose the motion of Indirect Purchaser Plaintiffs to achieve class certification in In re Lithium Ion Batteries Antitrust Litigation multidistrict litigation. and (2) on behalf of NTN Corporation, successfully arguing on behalf of all defendants in In re Bearings, which is part of the In re Auto Parts Antitrust MDL—one of the largest series of antitrust cases in U.S. history—the only class certification motion heard by the court in any of the MDL proceedings to date, a win recognized by Global Competition Review as its “Antitrust Case of the Year.”

Since joining Winston, Kessler has also continued to handle numerous disputes on behalf of the NBPA and NFLPA and the high-profile athletes they represent, including representing New England Patriots quarterback Tom Brady in successfully contesting at the district court level, a four-game suspension, imposed by NFL Commissioner Roger Goodell in connection with the “Deflategate” controversy.

Kessler led the team in a case that made national headlines in the United States for the NFLPA, scoring an historic victory for the NFLPA and NFL players Scott Fujita, Anthony Hargrove, Will Smith and Jonathan Vilma in the so-called “Bountygate” controversy. The victory allowed the players to rejoin their teams after an arbitration vacated the suspensions issued by Roger Goodell for allegedly participating in a program which rewarded players for knocking out their opponents.

Kessler’s representation of players’ unions continued through the NFLPA’s and the NBPA’s most recent collective bargaining negotiations, as well as through the COVID-19 pandemic, during which he represented the unions in negotiating their return-to-work agreements. He also represented the MLBPA in defeating a preliminary injunction sought against the 2021 All-Star Game.

Kessler has also recently served as lead class counsel for the World Cup-winning USWNT players in their action against the U.S. Soccer Federation, in which they contended that they have been denied their legal right to equal pay and working conditions to the members of the U.S. Men’s National Soccer Team, who have declared their support for the USWNT’s position. The case received intense global media attention in light of the USWNT players’ achieving their second World Cup win, while still receiving a much lower rate of pay than their male counterparts. The players successfully resolved their claims for equal working conditions on April 12, 2021, and are continuing their fight for equal pay in the Ninth Circuit court of appeals.

Rankings and Recognitions
Since joining Winston, Kessler has earned “Litigator of the Week” recognition by The American Lawyer for four of his impressive wins: (1) and (2) his June 2021 U.S. Supreme Court and March 2019 trial victories for classes of college athletes in their landmark antitrust challenge against the NCAA’s compensation restrictions in the Alston litigation; (3) his March 2018 defeat of the Indirect Purchaser Plaintiffs’ third attempt to obtain class certification in the In re Lithium Ion Batteries Antitrust MDL against Panasonic; and (4) his September 2015 victory on behalf of Tom Brady and the NFLPA in the “Deflategate” matter.

Moreover, The Legal Aid Society presented Kessler with its 2019 Servant of Justice Award for his lasting impact on New York’s legal community, recognizing his devotion to the protection of the economic and social justice rights of athletes and their communities. And Columbia University presented Kessler with its distinguished John Jay award in 2016 to recognize Kessler as one of its most distinguished alumni.

Kessler has been recognized by numerous publications, including Chambers USA – America’s Leading Lawyers for Business, the Best Lawyers in America©, and Benchmark Litigation US. He is recognized by the Guide to the World’s Leading Antitrust Lawyers and Who’s Who of Competition Lawyers and was included in Super Lawyers, Corporate Counsel Edition (2009) as well as The Lawdragon 500 Leading Lawyers in America (2005, 2006, and 2008 through 2021) and Lawdragon 500 Leading Litigators in America (2006). Kessler was named as a New York Super Lawyer (2006 through 2021), and as one of The 50 Most Influential People in Sports Business by Street & Smith’s Sports Business Journal, a publication which has also named him one of the 20 Most Influential People in the NFL. Kessler has also been named one of the United States’ Top 100 Trial Lawyers and a National Litigation Star for Antitrust by Benchmark Litigation US (2017–2021). He was recently named to Sports Business Journal’s list of 75 people who have grown the NBA’s business since the league was first established in 1946.

Personal life
Kessler has been married to his wife Regina since 1977, and has two children. He has lived in New York City for his entire life.

References

External links

1954 births
Living people
American lawyers
Columbia Law School alumni
Lafayette High School (New York City) alumni
Columbia College (New York) alumni
People associated with Winston & Strawn